"Hello Mary Lou" is a song written by American singer Gene Pitney first recorded by Johnny Duncan in 1960 and in the following year by Ricky Nelson. The song was recorded by Ricky Nelson at the famous United Western Recorders Studios on 22nd March, 1961.

Nelson's version, issued as a double A-side with his No. 1 hit "Travelin' Man", (Imperial 5741), reached No. 9 on the Billboard music charts on May 28, 1961. In the United Kingdom it reached No. 2. It was also a hit in much of Europe, particularly Norway, where it spent 14 weeks at No. 1 and in Sweden, where it spent five months in the best selling chart (July-December) and peaked at #2 during eight weeks. In New Zealand, the song reached No. 4.

A 1991 reissue following the song's use in a TV advert gave the song a second chart run, peaking at No. 45 in the UK Singles Chart.

The song features an influential guitar solo by James Burton, often cited by later guitarists such as Brian May. Piano is by Ray Johnson, who had succeeded Gene Garf as Nelson's regular session pianist in November 1959. Other musicians on the record include Joe Osborn on bass and Ritchie Frost on drums.

The song appears on Nelson's sixth album Rick Is 21 (1961).

Plagiarism settlement
"Hello Mary Lou" is similar to an earlier song, "Merry, Merry Lou", written by Cayet Mangiaracina and recorded by his band, the Sparks, in 1957 on a single released by Decca Records. It was covered by Bill Haley & His Comets as "Mary, Mary Lou" and released as a single later in 1957, also by Decca, and by Sam Cooke in 1958 for the Keen Records label. Mangiaracina would later become ordained as a Catholic priest. When "Hello Mary Lou" was released, the publisher of "Merry, Merry Lou", Champion Music (an arm of Decca Records), sued for plagiarism and a settlement was reached. Mangiaracina was given co-writing credit for "Hello Mary Lou" and a share of the song's royalties, while Champion received a share of the publishing.

Cover versions
 Bobby Lewis, in 1970. This version reached No. 14 on the Billboard Hot Country Singles chart.
 Led Zeppelin, in 1972, as part of their "Whole Lotta Love" medley, released in 2003 on How the West Was Won. It was removed from the 2018 remaster.

References

External links
 "Hello Mary Lou" lyrics at genius.com
 

1960 songs
1961 singles
Songs written by Gene Pitney
Ricky Nelson songs
Creedence Clearwater Revival songs
The Statler Brothers songs
Bobby Lewis (country singer) songs
Number-one singles in Norway
Imperial Records singles